Elytron is a Spain-based journal for specialists in coleopterology (the study of beetles).
It was first published in 1987.

Entomology journals and magazines
Elytron
Publications established in 1987